Rimrock is a populated place located in Yellowstone County, Montana, United States at .

The elevation is 3,468 feet. Rimrock appears on the Rimrock U.S. Geological Survey Map. Yellowstone County is in the Mountain Time Zone (UTC -7 hours).

History

Rimrock was established as a stop on the Great Northern Railroad and was named after a distinct sandstone cliff formation that it stood at the base of.

Today the area is closed to the public, including the 72nd Street West access. The area is primarily used for agriculture. Only a few trees and the now unused railroad siding and mound can be seen. There is little else at surface remaining. Much is hidden from ground view due to the high berm of the railroad, but the layout can be viewed from Philps Park, which occupies part of the cliff formations just above the site.

Sources
http://montana.hometownlocator.com/mt/yellowstone/rimrock.cfm

Ghost towns in Montana
Populated places in Yellowstone County, Montana